My Country II: Music To Beat Bush By is an album by folk rock singer-songwriter Dan Bern and his band the International Jewish Banking Conspiracy (or IJBC), released August 31, 2004 on Messenger Records. It consists of songs performed by Bern calling for George W. Bush to be defeated in the 2004 presidential election.

Reviews

Slant Magazines Sal Cinquemani gave My Country II 3.5 out of 5 stars, writing that Bern "shoots his dissent straight from the hip—lest we forget that folk music was the first punk rock." In another favorable review, Hot Presss Phil Udell described the album's music as "Country music with a sense of righteousness and a sense of humour."

Track listing
President – 7:36
Sammy’s Bat – 4:19
Tyranny – 4:38
Ostrich Town – 5:00
After the Parade – 3:11
My Country II – 3:06
The Torn Flag (originally by Pete Seeger) – 2:17
Bush Must Be Defeated – 3:58

References

2004 albums
Dan Bern albums
Political music albums by American artists
Messenger Records albums